Coed-y-bryn is a small village in the community of Troedyraur, Ceredigion, Wales. Coed-y-bryn is represented in the Senedd by Elin Jones and the Member of Parliament is Ben Lake (both Plaid Cymru).

Notable people 
 Siân James (1930–2021), a Welsh novelist, academic and translator
 Beti George (born 1939), a Welsh broadcaster of television and radio.

References

See also 
 List of localities in Wales by population 

Villages in Ceredigion